Alice Major is a Canadian poet, writer, and essayist, who served as poet laureate of Edmonton, Alberta. During her tenure as poet laureate, she founded the Edmonton Poetry Festival in 2006. She continues to serve on the Board of Directors for the Edmonton Poetry Festival Society as President.

Biography
Major emigrated from Scotland with her sister at the age of eight, and grew up in Toronto, Ontario before working as a weekly newspaper reporter in central British Columbia. She has lived in Edmonton, Alberta since 1981. She has a BA (English, history) from Trinity College, Toronto at the University of Toronto, and worked as a freelance writer specializing in utility issues.

She is past-president of the Writers' Guild of Alberta, and the League of Canadian Poets.
She has published six collections of poetry.
Her poetry has always been influenced by her interest in science and she has published a collection of essays, "Intersecting Sets: A Poet Looks at Science" (published by University of Alberta Press in 2011).

Awards
 2009 Pat Lowther Award

Works
"The moon of magpies quarrelling", Canadian Poetry Online
 The Chinese Mirror. (Irwin Publishing, 1988)  
 Time Travels Light. (Rowan Books, 1992)  
 
 
 Corona Radiata. (St. Thomas Press, 2000) 
 Some Bones and a Story. (Wolsak and Wynn, 2001)  
 No Monster (Victoria, Poppy Press, 2002)  
 
 The Office Tower Tales (University of Alberta Press, 2008)  
 Memory's Daughter (University of Alberta Press, 2010)  
 Intersecting Sets: A Poet Looks at Science (University of Alberta Press, 2011) 
 Standard Candles (University of Alberta Press, 2015) 

 Anthologies 
 Vintage'97/98. (Quarry Press, 1998) 
 Going it Alone: Plays by Women for Solo Performance. (Nuage Editions, 1997) 
 What if...? Amazing stories, Monica Hughes Ed. (Tundra Books, 1998) 
 
 Poetry and Spiritual Practice: Selections from Contemporary Canadian Poets (St. Thomas Press, 2002)  
 Poetry as Liturgy (St. Thomas Press, 2007) 

Further reading
 Don Perkins: Metaphors, myths, and the eye of the magpie in Ten Canadian Writers in Context. Dir. Curtis Gillespie, Marie J. Carrière, Jason Purcell. University of Alberta Press, Edmonton 2016, pp 115 – 138 (incl. excerpt from The office tower tales'', pp 122 – 138). Also in Google books

References

External links
 Alice Major's website

1949 births
Living people
20th-century Canadian poets
21st-century Canadian poets
Canadian women poets
Formalist poets
Writers from Toronto
20th-century Canadian women writers
21st-century Canadian women writers
Writers from Edmonton
Poets Laureate of places in Canada